Events from the year 1574 in art.

Events
Niccolò Circignani decorates the "Room of the Exploits" in the Palazzo del Comune at Castiglione del Lago.

Works

Niccolò Circignani - Frescos at Palazzo della Corgna in Castiglione del Lago
Jean de Court - Henri, Duke of Anjou
Corneille de Lyon - Gabrielle de Rochechouart
Hans von Aachen - Self-portrait (approximate date)

Births
April - Matteo Zaccolini, Italian painter, priest and author of the late Mannerist and early Baroque periods (died 1630)
May 14 - Daniel Dumonstier, French portraitist in crayon (died 1646)
date unknown
Francesco Brizio, Italian painter and engraver of the Bolognese School (died 1623)
Baccio Ciarpi, Italian painter (died 1654)
Guillaume Dupré, French sculptor and medallist (died 1643)
Nicodemo Ferrucci, Italian painter of the Baroque period (died 1650)
Giulio Cesare Procaccini, Italian painter and sculptor of Milan (died 1625)
Wen Zhenmeng, Chinese  Ming Dynasty painter, calligrapher, scholar, author, and garden designer (died 1636)

Deaths
March 18  – Lattanzio Gambara, Italian painter, active in Renaissance and Mannerist styles (born 1530)
June 27 – Giorgio Vasari, Italian painter and architect (born 1511)
October - Carlo Portelli, Italian painter (date of birth unknown)
October 1 - Marten van Heemskerk, Dutch portrait and religious painter (born 1498)
December 10 - Ascanio Condivi, Italian painter and writer, primarily remembered as the biographer of Michelangelo (born 1525)
date unknown
Ascanio Condivi, Italian painter and writer (born 1525)
Hans Eworth, Flemish painter (born 1520)
Camillo Filippi, Italian painter (date of birth unknown)
Francesco Menzocchi, Italian painter (born 1502)
probable
Joachim Beuckelaer, Flemish painter primarily of scenes of kitchen and markets (born 1533)
Jacopo Bertoia, Italian painter (born 1544)
Giulio Bonasone, Italian painter and engraver (born 1498)
Marco d'Agrate, Italian sculptor (born 1504)

 
Years of the 16th century in art